Time for Fantasy is a studio album by Amii Stewart released in 1988. One of the ballads, "I Still Believe," which had already become a major hit for pop singer Brenda K. Starr in 1987, was also covered by Mariah Carey some ten years later. The album has been re-released as Dusty Road, Heartache To Heartache, Run In The Night and It's Fantasy.

Track listing

Side A
"Dusty Road" (Douglas Meakin, Mike Francis) - 4:33 
"Heartache to Heartache" (Paul Bliss, Phil Palmer) - 3:36 
"Sometimes a Stranger" (Richard Feldman, Gary Mallaber,Amii Stewart - Time For Fantasy (CD reissue) @Discogs.com Retrieved 4-22-2018. Marcy Levy) - 3:51 
"Stand" (Maurice White, Robin Smith, Franne Golde) - 4:26 
"It's You and Me" (Adrienne Anderson, Giuseppe "Beppe" Cantarelli) - 3:55

Side B
"You Are in My System" (David Frank, Mic Murphy) - 4:15 
"Window Shopping" (Sylvia Moy) - 4:17 
"I Still Believe" (Antonina Armato, Cantarelli) - 3:53 
"Run in the Night" (Amii Stewart, Charlie Cannon, Francis) - 4:02 
"It's Fantasy" (Stewart, Franco Scepi, Sergio Menegale) - 4:16 
"Dusty Road (reprise)" (Meakin, Francis) - 1:04

Personnel
 Amii Stewart - lead vocals

"Dusty Road"
Ray Russell - guitar, brass arrangements
Jingles - Brazilian bass
Robin Smith - acoustic piano
Andy Duncan - percussion
Philip Todd - saxophone, alto flute
Pete Beachill - trombone
Derek Watkins - trumpet, flugelhorn
Guy Barker - trumpet, flugelhorn
Amii Stewart, John Kirby - backing vocals

"Heartache to Heartache"
Phil Palmer - guitar
Robin Smith - acoustic piano, brass arrangements
Andy Duncan - percussion
Philip Todd - saxophone
Neil Sidwell - trombone
Guy Barker - trumpet
John Barclay - trumpet
John Kirby - backing vocals

"Sometimes a Stranger"
Ray Russell - guitar
Philip Todd - EWI solo
Frank Ricotti - percussion
Royal Philharmonic Orchestra - orchestra
David Cullen - string arrangements
John Kirby - backing vocals

"Stand"
Aziz Ibrahim - guitar
Robin Smith - keyboards, brass arrangements
Philip Todd - saxophone
Neil Sidwell - trombone
Guy Barker - trumpet
John Barclay - trumpet
Andy Duncan - percussion
John Kirby - backing vocals

"It's You and Me"
Ray Russell - guitar
Robin Smith - electric piano
Frank Ricotti - percussion
Philip Todd - saxophone solo
Royal Philharmonic Orchestra - orchestra
David Cullen - string arrangements
John Kirby - backing vocals

"You Are in My System
Robin Smith - keyboards
Andy Duncan - percussion
Royal Philharmonic Orchestra - orchestra
David Cullen - string arrangements
John Kirby - backing vocals

"Window Shopping"
Ray Russell - brass arrangements
Philip Todd - saxophone
Pete Beachill - trombone
Guy Barker - trumpet
Stuart Brooks - trumpet
Amii Stewart - backing vocals

"I Still Believe"
Ray Russell - guitar
Robin Smith - keyboards
Andy Duncan - percussion
Frank Ricotti - percussion
Royal Philharmonic Orchestra - orchestra
David Cullen - string arrangements

"Run in the Night"
Aziz Ibrahim - guitar
Phil Palmer - guitar solo
Andy Duncan - percussion
Amii Stewart, John Kirby - backing vocals

"It's Fantasy"
Ronnie Trice - piano
Philip Todd - electric saxophone

Production
 Greg Walsh - producer

References

1988 albums
Amii Stewart albums